Kruzel is a surname. Notable people with the surname include:

 Joe Kruzel (born 1965), American baseball coach and former player
 Ondrej Kružel (born 1988), Slovak weightlifter

See also
 Kužel